Harvardiana refers to things associated with the Harvard University. These include:

 Harvardiana, a literary magazine published from 1835 to 1838.
 Harvardiana, a fight song.